Punjab Province may refer to:

 Punjab Province (British India), a former province of British India from 1849 to 1947

In Pakistan
 Punjab, Pakistan, a province in Pakistan from 1970 onward
 West Punjab, a province of Pakistan from 1947 to 1955

In India
 Punjab, India, the modern-day Punjab state in India from 1966 onward
 East Punjab, a province and later a state of India from 1947 to 1966

See also
Punjab region
Punjab (disambiguation)

Province name disambiguation pages